An outlet store, factory outlet or factory store is a brick and mortar or online store where manufacturers sell their merchandise directly to the public. Products at outlet stores are usually sold at reduced prices compared to regular stores due to being overstock, closeout, factory seconds, or lower-quality versions manufactured specifically for outlets. Traditionally, a factory outlet was a store attached to a factory or warehouse, sometimes allowing customers to watch the production process, such as in the original L.L. Bean store. In modern usage, outlet stores are typically manufacturer-branded stores such as Gap or Bon Worth grouped together in outlet malls. The invention of the factory outlet store is often credited to Harold Alfond, founder of the Dexter Shoe Company.

History 

Outlets first appeared in the eastern United States in the 1930s. Factory stores started to offer damaged or excess goods to employees at a low price. After some time, the audience expanded to include non-employees. In 1936, Anderson-Little (a men's clothing brand) opened an outlet store independent of its existing factories. Until the 1970s, the primary purpose of outlet stores was to dispose of excess or damaged goods.

In 1974, Vanity Fair opened up the first multi-store outlet center in Reading, Pennsylvania. Throughout the 1980s and 1990s, outlet malls grew rapidly in the United States. A typical outlet mall in the U.S. is opened with between 100,000 to 200,000 square feet (about 1 to 2 hectares) of retail space. This can gradually increase to 500,000 to 600,000 feet (around 5 hectares). The average outlet mall has an area of 216,000 square feet. In 2003, outlet malls in the U.S. generated $15 billion in revenue from 260 stores.

The number of U.S. outlet malls increased from 113 in 1988 to 276 in 1991 and to 325 in 1997 and 472 in 2013.

Outlet malls are not an exclusively American phenomenon. In Canada, the Dixie Outlet Mall dates from the late 1980s, and was followed by Vaughan Mills in 1999, and Toronto Premium Outlets in 2013. In Europe, retailer BAA McArthurGlen has opened 13 malls with over 1,200 stores and 3 million square feet (about 30 hectares) of retail space; describing itself as an "outlet village", Bicester Village, on the edge of the town of Bicester in Oxfordshire in England, is a regular stop for bus-tours of foreign tourists, especially from China. Stores have also been emerging in Japan since the mid to late 1990s.

Difference between outlet and regular stores 
A majority of the products sold by clothing and accessory manufacturers at outlet stores are specifically manufactured for outlets using lower-quality materials and manufacturing processes than their higher-priced products sold in regular stores.

Outlet stores often have more stringent return policies than regular stores, and manufacturers will typically not allow returns or exchanges for products purchased at outlets stores at their regular stores.

References

Retail formats
 
Sales promotion